Elliot Michael Bonds (born 23 March 2000) is a professional footballer who plays as a midfielder for Cheltenham Town. Born in England, he represents the Guyana national team.

Club career
Bonds originates from Kensal Rise, London and attended Oakington Manor School in Wembley. He has represented Middlesex and the Brent Schools' FA at various levels and was scouted by Eamonn Dolan for Reading. He also had a spell in the youth team of Brentford. In the summer of 2016 he signed a two-year scholarship with Dagenham & Redbridge. He was a part of the side that reached the FA Youth Cup fourth-round in the 2017–18 season.

He was rewarded with his first team debut in February 2018 when he replaced Fejiri Okenabirhie as a substitute in the 3–0 win over Torquay United, becoming the club's youngest ever senior player, aged 18. He made his first senior start in the 5–3 away win at Guiseley in April 2018. He made five first team appearances that season despite being a second-year scholar. In June 2018 he signed his first professional contract, a two-year deal until 2020. In December 2018, he was sent out on loan to Southern Football League Premier Division side Farnborough.

On 20 August 2019, Bonds joined Hull City on a one-year deal, with the club holding the option of a further year and initially joined up with the under-23 squad.

On 20 August 2020, Bonds joined Cheltenham Town on a season-long loan.

Bonds returned to Hull after rupturing his anterior cruciate ligament that put at end to his Cheltenham loan.

On 29 June 2021, Bonds signed a two-year contract with Cheltenham Town. On 20 October 2021, Bonds joined National League North side Kidderminster Harriers on loan until December. On 3 December 2021, the loan was extended by a further month until January 2022. In July 2022, Bonds signed a contract extension with Cheltenham until 2025.

International career
Bonds received his first call-up to the Guyana national team in November 2018 for the 2019–20 CONCACAF Nations League qualifier against French Guiana. He played the full ninety-minutes in the 2–1 defeat.

Career statistics

Club

International

References

External links

2000 births
Living people
Footballers from the London Borough of Brent
English footballers
English people of Guyanese descent
Guyanese footballers
Guyana international footballers
Association football midfielders
Dagenham & Redbridge F.C. players
Farnborough F.C. players
Hull City A.F.C. players
Cheltenham Town F.C. players
Kidderminster Harriers F.C. players
National League (English football) players
Southern Football League players
2019 CONCACAF Gold Cup players